Bruce David Rioch (born 6 September 1947) is a football manager and former player for the Scotland national team. His last managerial post was at AaB in the Danish Superliga in 2008.

As a player, he made more than 550 appearances in the Football League and, by virtue of his parents' birthplaces, represented Scotland in 24 matches; he became the first player born in England to captain Scotland. As a manager, he has taken charge of clubs in England, including Arsenal where he signed the famous Dennis Bergkamp, the United States, and Denmark. His brother Neil, son Gregor and nephew Matty Holmes were also professional footballers.

Playing career
Rioch was born in Aldershot, Hampshire: his father was serving there with the Scots Guards, eventually as a sergeant-major.  His father had been born in Kinneff, Aberdeenshire, and his mother in Skye, each qualifying him to play for Scotland. After moving to Luton, Bedfordshire, at the age of 14, he joined his local side, Luton Town, turning professional in September 1964. He made his first team debut later that month, and his league debut in November 1964 in a 1–0 defeat at home to Southend United. He spent a couple of years establishing himself and was a regular member of the Luton team, scoring 24 goals, that won the Fourth Division title in 1968. He moved to Aston Villa in July 1969 for a fee of £100,000, then a record fee paid by a Second Division side. He won a League Cup runners up medal in 1971, Villa losing 2–0 to Tottenham Hotspur.

He moved to Derby County in February 1974, winning a League Championship medal. He joined Everton in December 1976, but returned to Derby County in November 1977. After a dispute with the Derby manager, Tommy Docherty, Rioch had brief loan spells with Birmingham City in December 1978 and with Sheffield United in March 1979. He then left the Baseball Ground to play for NASL side Seattle Sounders. While playing with Seattle Sounders in 1980 he was named to the NASL First Team All-Stars. He returned to England in October 1980 when he joined Torquay United as player-coach, working at first under Mike Green and then under Frank O'Farrell.

Managerial career

Torquay United
In July 1982, Rioch became player-manager of Torquay United, but left in January 1984. In February 1985, after 13 months out of the game he was appointed manager of FC Seattle, of the US Western Soccer Alliance, but resigned in September 1985 to return to England.

Middlesbrough
He was appointed as manager of Middlesbrough in February 1986 and his first success in management came in 1987 when he guided Middlesbrough to runners-up spot in the Third Division and promotion to the Second Division at the end of a season which had started with them locked out of Ayresome Park by the official receiver and on the verge of bankruptcy. A year later they won a second successive promotion, this time as winners of the Second Division promotion/First Division relegation playoffs. Middlesbrough showed great promise in the first half of 1988–89, but fell away badly and were relegated on the last day of the season (despite having not occupied a relegation place prior to that). He was sacked the following March as the Teessiders hovered just above the Second Division drop zone but on the brink of their first ever Wembley final in the Zenith Data Systems Cup.

Millwall
Rioch made a quick return to management the following month with Millwall and guided them to a playoff place in the 1990–91 Second Division campaign, but left in March 1992.

Bolton Wanderers
Rioch's next stop was at Bolton Wanderers, becoming manager in May 1992. In his first season they beat cup holders Liverpool 2–0 at Anfield in an FA Cup replay which many fans feel was the start of Bolton's resurgence. They finished runners-up in Division Two and won promotion to Division One. The following year Bolton finished in a respectable mid-table position as well as beating Premier League opponents Arsenal, Everton and Aston Villa in the F.A cup. In the 1994/95 season they were League Cup losing finalists to Liverpool and beat Reading 4–3 in extra time in the Division One playoff final after being 2–0 down at half time.

The playoff final victory was Rioch's last game as Bolton manager. A few weeks later he accepted the Arsenal manager's job and was replaced at Bolton by Roy McFarland. He is considered to be one of the best Bolton managers of all time by the club's supporters.

Arsenal
In 1995–96, his only season at Arsenal, Rioch guided Arsenal to a UEFA Cup place, finishing fifth in the Premiership. It was achieved on the last day of the season, at the expense of Everton, Blackburn Rovers and Tottenham Hotspur. Arsenal also reached the League Cup semi-finals, but lost on away goals to Aston Villa, and were knocked out of the FA Cup in the third round by First Division side Sheffield United.

Just before the beginning of the 1996–97 season, Rioch was sacked, after a dispute with the club's board of directors over transfer funds.

Rioch was also known for his intensive training methods, according to former Arsenal player Adrian Clarke.

Queens Park Rangers
After leaving Arsenal, he worked as assistant manager under Stewart Houston (his former assistant at Arsenal) at Queens Park Rangers, but was sacked along with Houston after just over a year at Loftus Road.

Norwich City 
In May 1998, Rioch was appointed manager of Norwich City in Division One. He resigned after less than two seasons at the helm after failing to get the Canaries anywhere near the promotion and playoff places that the club had long been hoping for. He cited a perceived lack of ambition at the club as the main reason for his decision to resign (he correctly predicted that the club's star player Craig Bellamy would inevitably be sold), however he also acknowledged that the club's uncertain financial position meant that the transfer funds available to him were limited.

Wigan Athletic 
Rioch made a swift return to management with Wigan Athletic for the 2000–01 season. He won the Manager of the Month award for November 2000, but left the club the following February, as they occupied the Division Two play-off zone. The club said that Rioch had resigned, but he said he was dismissed.

Odense Boldklub (OB)
Rioch was intent on returning from management, and was linked with the Derby County manager's job after John Gregory was sacked at the end of the 2002–03 season. But it was four years before he made his return to management. He was appointed as head coach of Danish Superliga side OB in June 2005. He led OB to a third place in his first season in charge, but decided to leave the club on 12 March 2007 due to his wife's illness, as the official explanation. The media, however, reported that the actual cause was a dispute between Rioch and the management of OB.

Aalborg BK (AaB)
In June 2008, Rioch returned to management with Danish champions AaB after former head coach Erik Hamrén moved to Rosenborg BK. His first priority was to try to qualify AaB for the Champions League which they entered in the second qualifying round. He guided them into the group stage after defeating FK Modriča and FBK Kaunas. By beating Celtic, AaB came third and thus entered the UEFA Cup. Rioch, however, did not witness this victory from the bench: On 23 October 2008 he was dismissed as AaB had only two victories from ten games and were second from bottom of the Danish league.

Later career

In November 2009, Rioch was linked with a return to football as manager of the Scotland national team, this following the departure of George Burley. In March 2010, he took training sessions at Cornish non-League club Falmouth Town, near his home. He later became involved with coaching at another Cornish club, Penryn Athletic of the South West Peninsula League.

Honours

Player
Luton Town
Football League Fourth Division: 1967–68

Aston Villa
Football League Third Division: 1971–72
Football League Cup Runners-up: 1970–71

Derby County
Football League First Division:  1974–75
FA Charity Shield: 1975

Scotland
British Home Championship: 1975–76, 1976–77

Manager 
Bolton Wanderers
Football League First Division Play-offs: 1994–95
Football League Second Division Promotion: 1992–93
Football League Cup Runners-up: 1994–95

Middlesbrough
Football League Second Division Play-offs: 1987–88
Football League Third Division Promotion: 1986–87
Full Members Cup Runners-up: 1989–90

Managerial statistics

See also
 List of Scotland international footballers born outside Scotland
List of Scotland national football team captains

References

External links

Profile at the League Managers Association
Career information at ex-canaries.co.uk

1947 births
Living people
Sportspeople from Aldershot
English footballers
English people of Scottish descent
Scottish footballers
Scotland international footballers
Luton Town F.C. players
Aston Villa F.C. players
Derby County F.C. players
Everton F.C. players
Birmingham City F.C. players
Sheffield United F.C. players
Seattle Sounders (1974–1983) players
Torquay United F.C. players
English Football League players
North American Soccer League (1968–1984) players
1978 FIFA World Cup players
English football managers
Premier League managers
Torquay United F.C. managers
Middlesbrough F.C. managers
Millwall F.C. managers
Bolton Wanderers F.C. managers
Arsenal F.C. managers
Queens Park Rangers F.C. non-playing staff
Norwich City F.C. managers
Wigan Athletic F.C. managers
Western Soccer Alliance coaches
Odense Boldklub managers
AaB Fodbold managers
Seattle Storm (soccer) coaches
Expatriate football managers in Denmark
Association football midfielders
Scottish expatriate sportspeople in the United States
Expatriate soccer players in the United States
Scottish expatriate footballers
Scottish expatriate football managers
English expatriate sportspeople in the United States
English expatriate footballers
Footballers from Hampshire